<< List of Vanity Fair caricatures (1870-1874) >> List of Vanity Fair caricatures (1880-1884)

The following is from a list of caricatures  published 1875-1879 by the British magazine Vanity Fair (1868–1914).

Next List of Vanity Fair (British magazine) caricatures (1880-1884)

 
1870s in the United Kingdom